Queen Arjayadengjayaketana of Bali was a ruler of that island in 1200.

She was a member of Jaya Dynasty (Warmadewa dynasty) and successor of King Jayapangus, who was maybe her father.

Arjayadengjayaketana was likely a mother of King Haji Ekajayalancana. She was a regent for him.

She and her son were succeeded by King Bhatara Guru Śri Adikuntiketana.

Sources 

12th-century women rulers
Queens regnant in Asia
Monarchs of Bali
Indonesian Hindu monarchs
Women rulers in Indonesia
12th-century Indonesian women